Phyllodytes gyrinaethes is a species of frogs in the family Hylidae endemic to Brazil.
Its natural habitat is subtropical or tropical moist lowland forests. It is threatened by habitat loss.

Sources

Phyllodytes
Endemic fauna of Brazil
Frogs of South America
Amphibians described in 2003
Taxa named by Ulisses Caramaschi
Taxonomy articles created by Polbot